Sterphus spinosus is a species of Hoverfly in the family Syrphidae.

Distribution
Panama.

References

Eristalinae
Insects described in 1925
Diptera of South America
Taxa named by Raymond Corbett Shannon